A Christian mission is an organized effort for the propagation of the Christian faith. Missions involve sending individuals and groups across boundaries, most commonly geographical boundaries, to carry on evangelism or other activities, such as educational or hospital work. Sometimes individuals are sent and are called missionaries, and historically may have been based in mission stations. When groups are sent, they are often called mission teams and they do mission trips. There are a few different kinds of mission trips: short-term, long-term, relational and those that simply help people in need. Some people choose to dedicate their whole lives to mission. Missionaries preach the Christian faith (and sometimes to administer sacraments), and provide humanitarian aid. Christian doctrines (such as the "Doctrine of Love" professed by many missions) permit the provision of aid without requiring religious conversion. However, Christian missionaries are implicated in the genocide of indigenous peoples. Around 100,000 native people in California, U.S., or 1/3 of the native population, are said to have died due to missions.

History of Christian missions

The earliest Christian mission, the Great Commission and Dispersion of the Apostles, was active within Second Temple Judaism. Whether a Jewish proselytism existed or not that would have served as a model for the early Christians is unclear; see Circumcision controversy in early Christianity#Background for details. Soon, the expansion of the Christian mission beyond Judaism to those who were not Jewish became a contested issue, notably at the Council of Jerusalem. The Apostle Paul was an early proponent of this expansion, and contextualized the Christian message for the Greek and Roman cultures, allowing it to reach beyond its Hebrew and Jewish roots.

From Late Antiquity onward, much missionary activity was carried out by members of religious orders. Monasteries followed disciplines and supported missions, libraries, and practical research, all of which were perceived as works to reduce human misery and suffering and glorify the Christian God. For example, Nestorian communities evangelized parts of Central Asia, as well as Tibet, China, and India. Cistercians evangelized much of Northern Europe, as well as developing most of European agriculture's classic techniques. St Patrick evangelized many in Ireland. St David was active in Wales.

During the Middle Ages, Ramon Llull advanced the concept of preaching to Muslims and converting them to Christianity by means of non-violent argument. A vision for large-scale mission to Muslims would die with him, not to be revived until the 19th century.

Additional events can be found at the timeline of Christian missions.

Medieval
During the Middle Ages, Christian monasteries and missionaries such as Saint Patrick, and Adalbert of Prague propagated learning and religion beyond the boundaries of the old Roman Empire. In the seventh century Gregory the Great sent missionaries, including Augustine of Canterbury, into England, and in the eight century English Christians, notably Saint Boniface, spread Christianity into Germany.  The Hiberno-Scottish mission began in 563.

In the late thirteenth and early fourteenth centuries, Franciscans such as William of Rubruck, John of Montecorvino, and Giovanni ed' Magnolia were sent as missionaries to the Near and Far East. Their travels took them as far as China in an attempt to convert the advancing Mongols, especially the Great Khans of the Mongol Empire. (Also see Medieval Roman Catholic Missions in China.). In the later part of the fifteenth century, Portuguese missionaries had some success in spreading Christianity to the Kingdom of Kongo in West Africa

Catholic missions after 1492

One of the main goals of the Christopher Columbus expedition financed by Queen Isabella of Spain was to spread Christianity. During the Age of Discovery, Spain and Portugal established many missions in their American and Asian colonies. The most active orders were the Jesuits, Augustinians, Franciscans and Dominicans. The Portuguese sent missions into Africa. These are some of the most well-known missions in history.  While some of these missions were associated with imperialism and oppression, others (notably Matteo Ricci's Jesuit mission to China) were relatively peaceful and focused on inculturation rather than cultural imperialism.

In both Portugal and Spain, religion was an integral part of the state and evangelization was seen as having both secular and spiritual benefits.  Wherever these powers attempted to expand their territories or influence, missionaries would soon follow. By the Treaty of Tordesillas, the two powers divided the world between them into exclusive spheres of influence, trade and colonization. The proselytization of Asia became linked to Portuguese colonial policy.

From 1499 onward, Portuguese trade with Asia rapidly proved profitable. As Jesuits arrived in India around 1540 the colonial government in Goa supported the mission with incentives for baptized Christians. Beginning in 1552, the Church sent Jesuits to China and to other countries in Asia.

During the time of the Holland (Batavia) Mission (1592–1853), when the Roman Catholic church in the country was suppressed, there were neither parishes nor dioceses, and the country effectively became a mission area in which congregations were called "stations" (staties). Statie, usually called a clandestine church in English, refers to both the congregation's church and its seat or location.

Protestant missions

The Reformation unfolded in Europe in the early 16th century. For over a hundred years, occupied by their struggle with the Catholic Church, the early Protestant churches as a body were not strongly focused on missions to "heathen" lands. Instead, the focus was initially more on Christian lands in the hope to spread the Protestant faith, identifying the papacy with the Antichrist.

In the centuries that followed, Protestant churches began sending out missionaries in increasing numbers, spreading the proclamation of the Christian message to previously unreached people. In North America, missionaries to the Native Americans included Jonathan Edwards (1703–1758), the well-known preacher of the Great Awakening (ca 1731–1755), who in his later years retired from the very public life of his early career. He became a missionary to the Housatonic Native Americans (1751) and a staunch advocate for them against cultural imperialism.

As European culture has been established in the midst of indigenous peoples, the cultural distance between Christians of differing cultures has been difficult to overcome. One  early solution was the creation of segregated "praying towns" of Christian natives. This pattern of grudging acceptance of converts   played out again later in Hawaii when Congregational missionaries from New England went there and converted the native population, including the royalty. In the course of the Spanish colonization of the Americas, the Catholic missionaries learned the languages of the Amerindians and devised writing systems for them. Then they preached to indigenous people in those languages (Quechua, Guarani, Nahuatl) instead of Spanish, to keep Indians away from "sinful" whites. An extreme case of segregation occurred in the Guarani Reductions, a theocratic semi-independent region established by the Jesuits in the region of the future Paraguay between the early 17th century and 1767.

From 1732 onwards the Moravian Church began sending out missionaries.

Around 1780, an indigent Baptist cobbler named William Carey began reading about James Cook's travels voyages in Polynesia. His interest grew to a furious sort of "backwards homesickness", inspiring him to obtain Baptist orders, and eventually to write his famous 1792 pamphlet, "An Enquiry into the Obligation of Christians to use Means for the Conversion of Heathen". Far from a dry book of theology, Carey's work used the best available geographic and ethnographic data to map and count the number of people who had never heard the Gospel. It inspired a movement that has grown with increasing speed from his day to the present.

In the United States, the American Board of Commissioners for Foreign Missions (ABCFM) was chartered in 1812.

Protestant missionaries from the Anglican, Lutheran and Presbyterian traditions starting arriving in what was then the Ottoman Empire in the first half of the 19th Century. This eventually let to the creation of what are today the Evangelical Lutheran Church in Jordan and the Holy Land and the see of the Anglican Bishop in Jerusalem. Furthermore, it was during this time that the Christian and Missionary Alliance started their missionary activity in Jerusalem.

American "Hard-shell Baptists", "Anti-Mission Baptists", or "Old School Baptists" adhering to strict Calvinism rejected all mission boards, Bible tract societies, and temperance societies as nonbiblical. This faction was strongest in the American South. The mainstream of the Baptist denomination, however, supported missionary work.

Thomas Coke, (1747–1814) the first bishop of the American Methodists, was "the Father of Methodist Missions". After spending time in the newly formed United States of America strengthening the infant Methodist Church alongside Episcopal colleague Francis Asbury, the British-born Coke left for mission work. During his time in America, Coke worked vigorously to increase Methodist support of Christian missions and of raising up mission workers. Coke died while on a mission trip to India, but his legacy among Methodists – his passion for missions – continues.

China

A wave of missions, starting in the early 1850s, targeted inland areas, led by a Briton Hudson Taylor (1832–1905) with his China Inland Mission (1865– ). Taylor was later supported by Henry Grattan Guinness (1835–1910) who founded (1883) Cliff College, which continues  to train and equip for local and global mission.

The missions inspired by Taylor and Guinness have collectively been called "faith missions" and owe much to the ideas and example of Anthony Norris Groves (1795–1853). Taylor, a thorough-going nativist, offended the missionaries of his era by wearing Chinese clothing and speaking Chinese at home. His books, speaking, and examples led to the formation of numerous inland missions and of the Student Volunteer Movement (SVM, founded in 1886), which from 1850 to about 1950 sent nearly 10,000 missionaries to inland areas, often at great personal sacrifice. Many early SVM missionaries traveling to areas with endemic tropical diseases left with their belongings packed in a coffin, aware that 80% of them would die within two years.

British Empire
In the 18th century, and even more so in the 19th century, missionaries based in Britain saw the British Empire as a fertile field for proselytizing for Christianity. All the main denominations were involved, including the Church of England, Scottish Presbyterian, and Nonconformists. Much of the enthusiasm emerged from the Evangelical revival.  Within the Church of England, the Church Mission Society (CMS) originated in 1799 and went on to undertake activity all around the world, including in what became known as "the Middle East".

Before the American Revolution, British Anglican and Methodist missionaries were active in the Thirteen Colonies. The Methodists, led by George Whitefield, were the most successful and after the Revolution an entirely distinct American Methodist denomination emerged that became the largest Protestant denomination in the United States.  A major problem for  British colonial officials was the demand of the Church of England to set up an American bishop; this was strongly opposed by most of the Americans colonists, as it had never happened before. Colonial officials increasingly took a neutral position on religious matters, even in those colonies such as Virginia where the Church of England was officially established, but in practice controlled by laymen in the local vestries. After the American War of Independence, colonial officials decided to enhance the power and wealth of the Church of England in all British colonies, including British North America.

Missionary societies funded their own operations that were not supervised or directed by the Colonial Office. Tensions emerged between the missionaries and the colonial officials. The latter feared that missionaries might stir up trouble or encourage the natives to challenge colonial authority. In general, colonial officials were much more comfortable with working with the established local leadership, including the native religions, rather than introducing the divisive force of Christianity. This proved especially troublesome in India, were very few local elites were attracted to Christianity. In Africa, especially, the missionaries made many converts. As of the 21st century there were more Anglicans in Nigeria than in England.

Christian missions in Australia played a part in both indoctrinating Aboriginal Australians into Christianity, and in controlling their movements and removing children from families, leading to the Stolen Generations. German missionaries ran Lutheran and other mission stations and schools, from the earliest days of colonisation of Australia. One of the largest organisations was the United Aborigines Mission, which ran dozens of missionaries and stations in Western Australia, New South Wales and South Australia in the 1900s.

Missionaries increasingly came to focus on education, medical help, and long-term modernization of the native personality to inculcate European middle-class values.  They established schools and medical clinics.   Christian missionaries played a public role, especially in promoting sanitation and public health.  Many were trained as physicians, or took special courses in public health and tropical medicine at Livingstone College, London.

After 1870
By the 1870s, Protestant missions around the world generally acknowledged the long-term material goal was the formation of independent, self-governing, self-supporting, self-propagating churches.  The rise of nationalism in the Third World provoked challenges from critics who complained that the missionaries were teaching Western ways, and ignoring the indigenous culture.  The Boxer Rebellion in China in 1899–1901 involved bloody attacks on Christian missions and especially their converts.  The First World War diverted resources, and pulled most Germans out of missionary work when that country lost its empire.  The worldwide Great Depression of the 1930s was a major blow to funding mission activities.

In 1910, the Edinburgh Missionary Conference was presided over by active SVM and YMCA leader John R. Mott, an American Methodist layperson, the conference reviewed the state of evangelism, Bible translation, mobilization of church support, and the training of indigenous leadership.  Looking to the future, conferees worked on strategies for worldwide evangelism and cooperation. The conference not only established greater ecumenical cooperation in missions, but also essentially launched the modern ecumenical movement.

The next wave of missions was started by two missionaries, Cameron Townsend and Donald McGavran, around 1935. These men realized that although earlier missionaries had reached geographic areas, there were numerous ethnographic groups that were isolated by language, or class from the groups that missionaries had reached. Cameron formed Wycliffe Bible Translators to translate the Bible into native languages. McGavran concentrated on finding bridges to cross the class and cultural barriers in places like India, which has upwards of 4,600 peoples, separated by a combination of language, culture, and caste. Despite democratic reforms, caste and class differences are still fundamental in many cultures.

An equally important dimension of missions strategy is the indigenous method of nationals reaching their own people. In Asia this wave of missions was pioneered by men like Dr G. D. James of Singapore, Rev Theodore Williams of India  and Dr David Cho of Korea. The "two thirds missions movement" as it is referred to, is today a major force in missions.

Most modern missionaries and missionary societies have repudiated cultural imperialism, and elected to focus on spreading the gospel and translating the Bible. Sometimes, missionaries have been vital in preserving and documenting the culture of the peoples among whom they live.

Often, missionaries provide welfare and health services, as a good deed or to make friends with the locals. Thousands of schools, orphanages, and hospitals have been established by missions. One service provided by missionaries was the Each one, teach one literacy program begun by Dr. Frank Laubach in the Philippines in 1935. The program has since spread around the world and brought literacy to the least enabled members of many societies.

During this period missionaries, especially evangelical and Pentecostal missionaries, witnessed a substantial increase in the number of conversions of Muslims to Christianity. In an interview published in 2013 a leader of a key missionary agency focused on Muslims claimed that the world is living in a "day of salvation for Muslims everywhere."

The word "mission" was historically often applied to the building, the "mission station" in which the missionary lives or works. In some colonies, these mission stations became a focus of settlement of displaced or formerly nomadic people. Particularly in rural Australia, mission stations (known as missions) became home to many Indigenous Australians.

Additional events can be found at the Timeline of Christian missions.

Contemporary concepts of mission

Sending and receiving nations
Major nations not only send and fund missionaries abroad, but also receive them from other countries. In 2010, the United States sent out 127,000 missionaries, while 32,400 came to the United States. Brazil was second, sending out 34,000, and receiving 20,000. France sent out 21,000 and received 10,000. Britain sent out 15,000 and received 10,000. India sent out 10,000 and received 8000. Other major exporters included Spain at 21,000 sent out, Italy at 20,000, South Korea at 20,000, Germany at 14,000, and Canada at 8,500. Large recipient nations included Russia, receiving 20,000; Congo receiving 15,000; South Africa, 12,000; Argentina, 10,000; and Chile, 8,500. The largest sending agency in the United States is the Church of Jesus Christ of Latter Day Saints who, at this date 2019, has 67,000 full time proselytizing young missionaries all over the world with many more elder missionaries serving in similar circumstances. The Southern Baptist Convention, has 4,800 missionaries, plus 450 support staff working inside the United States. The annual budget is about $50,000 per year per missionary. In recent years, however, the Southern Baptist foreign missionary operation (the International Mission Board) has operated at a deficit, and it is cutting operations by 15 percent. It is encouraging older missionaries to retire and return to the United States.

Modern missionary methods and doctrines among conservative Protestants
The Lausanne Congress of 1974, birthed a movement that supports evangelical mission among non-Christians and nominal Christians. It regards "mission" as that which is designed "to form a viable indigenous church-planting and world changing movement." This definition is motivated by a theologically imperative theme of the Bible to make God known, as outlined in the Great Commission. The definition is claimed to summarize the acts of Jesus' ministry, which is taken as a model motivation for all ministries.

This Christian missionary movement seeks to implement churches after the pattern of the first century Apostles. The process of forming disciples is necessarily social. "Church" should be understood in the widest sense, as a body of believers of Christ rather than simply a building. In this view, even those who are already culturally Christian must be "evangelized".

Church planting by cross-cultural missionaries leads to the establishment of self-governing, self-supporting and self-propagating communities of believers. This is the famous "three-self" formula formulated by Henry Venn of the London Church Missionary Society in the 19th century. Cross-cultural missionaries are persons who accept church-planting duties to evangelize people outside their culture, as Christ commanded in the Great Commission.

The objective of these missionaries is to give an understandable presentation of their beliefs with the hope that people will choose to following the teaching of Jesus Christ and live their lives as His disciples. As a matter of strategy, many evangelical Christians around the world now focus on what they call the "10/40 window", a band of countries between 10 and 40 degrees north latitude and reaching from western Africa through Asia. Christian missions strategist Luis Bush pinpointed the need for a major focus of evangelism in the "10/40 Window", a phrase he coined in his presentation at the missionary conference Lausanne 1989 in Manila. Sometimes referred to as the "Resistant Belt", it is an area that includes 35% of the world's land mass, 90% of the world's poorest peoples and 95% of those who have yet to hear anything about Christianity.

Modern mission techniques are sufficiently refined that within ten to fifteen years, most indigenous churches are locally pastored, managed, taught, self-supporting and evangelizing. The process can be substantially faster if a preexisting translation of the Bible and higher pastoral education are already available, perhaps left over from earlier, less effective missions.

One strategy is to let indigenous cultural groups decide to adopt Christian doctrines and benefits, when (as in most cultures) such major decisions are normally made by groups. In this way, opinion leaders in the groups can persuade much or most of the groups to convert. When combined with training in discipleship, church planting and other modern missionary doctrine, the result is an accelerating, self-propelled conversion of large portions of the culture.

A typical modern mission is a co-operative effort by many different ministries, often including several coordinating ministries, such as the Faith2Share network, often with separate funding sources. One typical effort proceeded as follows:

 A missionary radio group recruits, trains and broadcasts in the main dialect of the target culture's language. Broadcast content is carefully adapted to avoid syncretism yet help the Christian Gospel seem like a native, normal part of the target culture. Broadcast content often includes news, music, entertainment and education in the language, as well as purely Christian items.
 Broadcasts might advertise programs, inexpensive radios (possibly spring-wound), and a literature ministry that sells a Christian mail-order correspondence course at nominal costs. The literature ministry is key, and is normally a separate organization from the radio ministry. Modern literature missions are shifting to web-based content where it makes sense (as in Western Europe and Japan).
 When a person or group completes a correspondence course, they are invited to contact a church-planting missionary group from (if possible) a related cultural group. The church-planting ministry is usually a different ministry from either the literature or radio ministries. The church-planting ministry usually requires its missionaries to be fluent in the target language, and trained in modern church-planting techniques.
 The missionary then leads the group to start a church. Churches planted by these groups are usually a group that meets in a house. The object is the minimum organization that can perform the required character development and spiritual growth. Buildings, complex ministries and other expensive items are mentioned, but deprecated until the group naturally achieves the size and budget to afford them. The crucial training is how to become a Christian (by faith in Jesus Christ) and then how to set up a church (meet to study the Bible, and perform communion and worship), usually in that order.
 A new generation of churches is created, and the growth begins to accelerate geometrically. Frequently, daughter churches are created only a few months after a church's creation. In the fastest-growing Christian movements, the pastoral education is "pipelined", flowing in a just-in-time fashion from the central churches to daughter churches. That is, planting of churches does not wait for the complete training of pastors.

The most crucial part of church planting is selection and training of leadership. Classically, leadership training required an expensive stay at a seminary, a Bible college. Modern church planters deprecate this because it substantially slows the growth of the church without much immediate benefit. Modern mission doctrines replace the seminary with programmed curricula or (even less expensive) books of discussion questions, and access to real theological books. The materials are usually made available in a major trading language in which most native leaders are likely to be fluent. In some cases, the materials can be adapted for oral use.

It turns out that new pastors' practical needs for theology are well addressed by a combination of practical procedures for church planting, discussion in small groups, and motivated Bible-based study from diverse theological texts. As a culture's church's wealth increases, it will naturally form classic seminaries on its own.

Another related mission is Bible translation. The above-mentioned literature has to be translated. Missionaries actively experiment with advanced linguistic techniques to speed translation and literacy. Bible translation not only speeds a church's growth by aiding self-training, but it also assures that Christian information becomes a permanent part of the native culture and literature. Some ministries also use modern recording techniques to reach groups with audio that could not be soon reached with literature.

Among Roman Catholics
For Catholics, “Missions” is the term given to those particular undertakings by which the heralds of the Gospel, sent out by the Church and going forth into the whole world, carry out the task of preaching the Gospel and planting the Church among peoples or groups who do not yet believe in Christ.

Vatican II made a deep impact on Catholic missions around the world. The Church's relations to non-Christian religions like Judaism and Islam were revisited.

A steep decline in the number of people entering the priesthood and religious life in the West has made the Church look towards laity more and more. Communities like Opus Dei arose to meet this need.

Inculturation increasingly became a key topic of missiological reflection for Catholics. Inculturation is understood as the meeting of the Christian message with a community in their cultural context.

Liberation Theology and liturgical reform have also been important in forming and influencing the mission of the Catholic Church in the 20th and 21st Centuries.

In relation to mission, Pope Benedict XVI made the re-evangelization of Europe and North America a priority in his own ministry, even while the upper leadership of the Roman Catholic hierarchy and the college of cardinals has more members from Latin America, Africa, and Asia than ever before.

Key documents on mission for Catholics during this period are Evangelii nuntiandi by Pope Paul VI and Redemptoris missio by Pope John Paul II.

Print and new media in mission 
Christian mission organisations have long depended on the printed word as a channel through which to do mission.  At times when countries have been "closed" to Christians, great efforts have been made to smuggle Bibles and other literature into those countries. Brother Andrew, the founder of Open Doors, started smuggling Bibles into communist countries in the 1950s.  Operation Mobilisation was established in 1957 by George Verwer.  Other Christian publishers, such as Plough Publishing, provide free books to people in the UK and US as a form of mission. The Bible Society translates and prints Bibles, in an attempt to reach every country in the world.

The internet now provides Christian mission organisations a convent way of reaching people in the form of podcasts.  Podcasts provide a way of dissemination for a message that has potential to endanger the recipient, since it is very hard to track who has downloaded a specific podcast.  An example of this is the Crescent Project.  Other podcasts, such as the Life Together podcast, The Sacred, and Harvest are aimed at both non-Christians and Christians in the home country.

Reverse mission 

The shift in world Christian population from Europe and North America to the non-Western world, and the migration of Africans, Asians, and Latin Americans to the West has given rise to what some have termed "reverse mission". It demonstrates a reversal of the missionary movement, in that it reverses the direction of earlier missionary efforts.

Inter-Organizational Missions
Globalization of the 21st century has served as a platform for opportunity for independent Christian organizations to unite together in cooperation for outreach missions and discipleship.

Some organizations are Christian consortiums which organizationally band together like 50,000 persons in the Illinois based Missio Nexus organization led by Ted Esler.

Other organizations are united by a common source of financial funding, cooperation in outreach projects and digital communications between internal missions personnel around the world and their partners like the 25,000 people united in the Global Missions Network Foundation, founded by Anton R. Williams of Kalamazoo, Michigan and Grand Rapids, Michigan

Still other organizations sign legal contacts with an agencies to join together for specific functions in missions like the SIMS organization.

Criticism

In 1924, Mahatma Gandhi wrote:

In India, Hindu organisations such as the Rashtriya Swayamsevak Sangh assert that most conversions undertaken by zealous evangelicals occur due to compulsion, inducement or fraud. In the Indian state of Tripura, the government has alleged financial and weapons-smuggling connections between Baptist missionaries and rebel groups such as the National Liberation Front of Tripura.  The accused Tripura Baptist Christian Union is a member body of the Baptist World Alliance.

In mid-May, the Vatican was also co-sponsoring a meeting about how some religious groups abuse liberties by proselytizing, or by evangelizing in aggressive or deceptive ways. Iraq ... has become an open field for foreigners looking for fresh converts. Some Catholic Church leaders and aid organizations have expressed concern about new Christian groups coming in and luring Iraqis to their churches with offers of cash, clothing, food or jobs. ... Reports of aggressive proselytism and reportedly forced conversions in mostly Hindu India have fueled religious tensions and violence there and have prompted some regional governments to pass laws banning proselytism or religious conversion. ... Sadhvi Vrnda Chaitanya, a Hindu monk from southern India, told CNS that India's poor and uneducated are especially vulnerable to coercive or deceptive methods of evangelization. ... Aid work must not hide any ulterior motives and avoid exploiting vulnerable people like children and the disabled, she said.

In an interview with Outlook magazine, Sadhvi Vrnda Chaitanya said "If the Vatican could understand that every religious and spiritual tradition is as sacred as Christianity, and that they have a right to exist without being denigrated or extinguished, it will greatly serve the interests of dialogue, mutual respect, and peaceful coexistence."

Communicating diseases 
European explorers in the Americas introduced Afro-Eurasian diseases to which Amerindian peoples had no immunity, leading to tens of millions of deaths. Missionaries, along with other travelers, brought diseases into native populations. Smallpox, measles, and common cold, have been blamed on their arrivals.
David Igler of the University of California, Irvine, includes missionary activity as a cause of spreading germs. However, he says that commercial traders were the main agents of disease.

Aid and evangelism
While there is a general agreement among most major aid organizations not to mix aid with proselyting, others see disasters as a useful opportunity to spread the word. One such an occurrence was the tsunami that devastated parts of Asia on December 26, 2004.

"This (disaster) is one of the greatest opportunities God has given us to share his love with people," said K.P. Yohannan, president of the Texas-based Gospel for Asia. In an interview, Yohannan said his 14,500 "native missionaries" in India, Sri Lanka and the Andaman Islands are giving survivors Bibles and booklets about "how to find hope in this time through the word of God." In Krabi, Thailand, a Southern Baptist church had been "praying for a way to make inroads" with a particular ethnic group of fishermen, according to Southern Baptist relief coordinator Pat Julian. Then came the tsunami, "a phenomenal opportunity" to provide ministry and care, Julian told the Baptist Press news service. ... Not all evangelicals agree with these tactics. "It's not appropriate in a crisis like this to take advantage of people who are hurting and suffering", said the Rev. Franklin Graham, head of Samaritan's Purse and son of evangelist Billy Graham.

The Christian Science Monitor echoes these concerns: "'I think evangelists do this out of the best intentions, but there is a responsibility to try to understand other faith groups and their culture,' says Vince Isner, director of FaithfulAmerica.org, a program of the National Council of Churches USA."

The Bush administration has made it easier for U.S. faith-based groups and missionary societies to tie aid and church together.
For decades, US policy has sought to avoid intermingling government programs and religious proselytizing. The aim is both to abide by the Constitution's prohibition against a state religion and to ensure that aid recipients don't forgo assistance because they don't share the religion of the provider. ... But many of those restrictions were removed by Bush in a little-noticed series of executive orders – a policy change that cleared the way for religious groups to obtain hundreds of millions of dollars in additional government funding. It also helped change the message American aid workers bring to many corners of the world, from emphasizing religious neutrality to touting the healing powers of the Christian God.

Christian counter-claims
Missionaries say that the government in India has passed anti-conversion laws in several states that are supposedly meant to prevent conversions from "force or allurement", but are primarily used, they say, to persecute and criminalize voluntary conversion due to the government's broad definition of "force and allurement". Any gift received from a Christian in exchange for, or with the intention of, conversion is considered allurement. Voice of the Martyrs reports that aid-workers claim that they are being hindered from reaching people with much needed services as a result of this persecution. Alan de Lastic, Roman Catholic archbishop of New Delhi states that claims of forced conversion are false.

"'There are attacks practically every week, maybe not resulting in death, but still, violent attacks,' Richard Howell, general secretary of the Evangelical Fellowship of India tells The Christian Science Monitor today. 'They [India's controlling BJP party] have created an atmosphere where minorities do feel insecure.'" According to Prakash Louis, director of the secular Indian Social Institute in New Delhi, "We are seeing a broad attempt to stifle religious minorities and their constitutional rights ... Today, they say you have no right to convert, Tomorrow you have no right to worship in certain places." Existing congregations, often during times of worship, are being persecuted. Properties are sometimes destroyed and burnt to the ground, while native pastors are sometimes beaten and left for dead.

Political scientist Robert Woodberry claims that conversionary Protestants were a crucial catalyst in spreading religious liberty, education, and democracy. While his historical analysis is exhaustive, the accompanying empirical evidence suffers from severe inconsistencies. Elena Nikolova and Jakub Polansky replicate Woodberry's analysis using twenty-six alternative democracy measures and extend the time period over which the democracy measures are averaged. These two simple modifications lead to the breakdown of Woodberry's results. Overall, no significant relationship between Protestant missions and the development of democracy can be established.

A major contribution of the Christian missionaries in Africa, China, Guatemala, India, Indonesia, Korea, and other places was better health care of the people through hygiene and introducing and distributing soap, and "cleanliness and hygiene became an important marker of being identified as a Christian".

See also

Adventist Mission
Catholic Church and the Age of Discovery
Catholic missions
Christianization
Colonialism
Cultural imperialism
Emmanuel Community
Fidesco International
Indian Reductions
Jesuit Reductions
List of Protestant missionary societies
List of Christian missionaries
List of Spanish missions
Missions in California
Mission (LDS Church)
Missional living
Missionary (LDS Church)
Outstation (church)
Proselytism
Religious conversion
Secondary conversion
Short-term mission
Timeline of Christian missions
Youth with a Mission

References

Further reading
Anderson, Gerald H., (ed.) Biographical dictionary of Christian missions, Simon & Schuster Macmillan, 1998
Arles, Siga. Theological Education for the Mission of the Church in India: 1947 - 1987, New York: Peter Lang, 1992.  
Bainbridge, William F.  Around the World Tour of Christian Missions: A Universal Survey (1882) 583 pages; full text online
 Barnes, Jonathan S. Power and Partnership: A History of the Protestant Mission Movement (Wipf and Stock Publishers, 2013)
Barrett, David, ed. World Christian Encyclopedia, Oxford University Press, 1982.
 Beaver, R. Pierce. "North American Thought on the Fundamental Principles of Missions During the Twentieth Century". Church History 21.4 (1952): 345–364. 
 Beaver, R. Pierce. ed American Missions in Bicentennial Perspective(1977).
 Beaver, Robert Pierce. American Protestant Women in World Mission: History of the First Feminist Movement in North America. (WB Eerdmans Publishing Company, 1980).
 Beaver, Robert Pierce. Church, state, and the American Indians: two and a half centuries of partnership in missions between Protestant churches and government (Concordia Pub. House, 1966).
 Beaver, Robert Pierce. Missionary Motivation through Three Centuries (1968).
 Best, Jeremy. "Godly, International, and Independent: German Protestant Missionary Loyalties before World War I". Central European History (2014) 47#3 pp: 585–611.
 Bevans, Stephen B. A Century of Catholic Mission (2013)  excerpt; wide-ranging survey focused on 20th century worldwide
The Catholic Encyclopedia, (1913) online, worldwide detailed coverage
 Cnattingius, Hans. Bishops and societies: A study of Anglican colonial and missionary expansion, 1698–1850 (1952)
 Dries, Angelyn. The missionary movement in American Catholic history  (Maryknoll, NY: Orbis Books, 1998)
 Dunch, Ryan. "Beyond cultural imperialism: Cultural theory, Christian missions, and global modernity". History and Theory 41.3 (2002): 301–325. online
 Dwight, Henry Otis et al. eds., The Encyclopedia of Missions (2nd ed. 1904) Online, Global coverage Of Protestant and Catholic missions.
 Endres, David J. American Crusade: Catholic Youth in the World Mission Movement from World War I Through Vatican II (2010)
Etherington, Norman, ed. Missions and Empire (Oxford History of the British Empire Companion Series) (2008)
 Fitzpatrick-Behrens, Susan. The Maryknoll Catholic Mission in Peru, 1943–1989: Transnational Faith and Transformation (2012)
Glazier, Michael and Monika K. Hellwig, eds., The Modern Catholic Encyclopedia, Liturgical Press, 2004
Glover, Robert H. The Progress of World-Wide Missions, rev. by J. Herbert Kane., Harper and Row, 1960
 Graham, Gael. Gender, culture, and Christianity: American Protestant mission schools in China, 1880–1930 (P. Lang, 1995)
Herzog, Johann Jakob, Philip Schaff, and Albert Hauck. The New Schaff-Herzog Encyclopedia of Religious Knowledge, 12 volumes, Funk and Wagnalls Company, 1910–11
 Hollinger, David A. Protestants Abroad: How Missionaries Tried to Change the World but Changed America (2017) excerpt
 Huntley, Martha. Caring, growing, changing: a history of the Protestant mission in Korea (Friendship Press, 1984)

Kane, J. Herbert. A Concise History of the Christian World Mission, Baker, 1982
Latourette, Kenneth Scott. A History of the Expansion of Christianity, 7 volumes, (1938–45), the most detailed scholarly history
 MacCulloch, Diarmaid. Christianity: The First Three Thousand Years (2009) 
Moreau, A. Scott, David Burnett, Charles Edward van Engen and Harold A. Netland. Evangelical Dictionary of World Missions, Baker Book House Company, 2000
Neill, Stephen. A History of Christian Missions. Penguin Books, 1986
Newcomb, Harvey. A Cyclopedia of Missions: Containing a Comprehensive View of Missionary Operations Throughout the World : with Geographical Descriptions, and Accounts of the Social, Moral, and Religious Condition of the People (1860) 792 pages complete text online
Pocock, Michael, Gailyn Van Rheenen, Douglas McConnell. The Changing Face of World Missions: Engaging Contemporary Issues And Trends (2005); 391 pages
 Ragsdale, John P. Protestant mission education in Zambia, 1880–1954 (Susquehanna University Press, 1986)
 Robert, Dana L. Christian Mission: How Christianity Became a World Religion (2009), 226pp; short survey
 Sievernich, Michael (2011), Christian Mission, EGO - European History Online, Mainz: Institute of European History, retrieved: March 25, 2021 (pdf).
Stanley, Brian. The Bible and the Flag: Protestant Mission and British Imperialism in the 19th and 20th Centuries (1990)
Stanley, Brian. The Global Diffusion of Evangelicalism: The Age of Billy Graham and John Stott (2013)
 Tejirian, Eleanor H.,  and Reeva Spector Simon, eds. Conflict, Conquest, and Conversion: Two Thousand Years of Christian Missions in the Middle East (Columbia University Press; 2012) 280 pages;  focus on the 19th and 20th centuries.
  Tyrrell, Ian. Reforming the World: The Creation of America's Moral Empire (2010)  excerpt and text search
Tucker, Ruth. From Jerusalem to Irian Jaya:From Jerusalem to Irian Jaya: A Biographical History of Christian Missions (2nd ed. 2004)  excerpt and text search
 Yates, Timothy. The Conversion of the Maori: Years of Religious and Social Change, 1814–1842 (2013)
 
Journal Social Sciences and Missions (Leiden: Brill), established 1995.

Positive or neutral
 Gailey and Culbertson. Discovering Missions by 
 Johnstone Operation World  
 Moreau, Corwin and McGree. Introducing World Missions 
Olson, C. Gordon. What in the World is God Doing? Global Gospel Publishers, 2003
Parker, J. Fred. Mission to the World. Nazarene Publishing House, 1988
 Van Rheenen Missions by 
 Winter and Hawthorne, eds. Perspectives on the World Christian Movement

Critical
 "Vindicated by time – The Niyogi Committee Report On Christian Missionary Activities in Madhya Pradesh (India)"
 "History of Hindu – Christian Encounters 304 AD to 1996" By Sita Ram Goel, Publisher:Voice of India, New Delhi
 Shourie, A. (1994). Missionaries in India: Continuities, changes, dilemmas. New Delhi: ASA Publications.
 Missionary Conquest: The Gospel and Native American Cultural Genocide by George E. Tinker 
 The Missionaries: God Against the Indians by Norman Lewis 
 The Dark Side of Christian History by Helen Ellerbe 
 Goel, S. R. (1996). History of Hindu-Christian encounters, AD 304 to 1996. 
 Repression of Buddhism in Sri Lanka by the Portuguese (1505–1658) by Senaka Weeraratna
 Rajiv Malhotra: How Evangelists Invented 'Dravidian Christianity'
 Peter Rohrbacher: Völkerkunde und Afrikanistik für den Papst. Missionsexperten und der Vatikan 1922–1939 in: Römische Historische Mitteilungen 54 (2012), 583–610.

External links

Missionary Organizations, missionary organizations directory
Missiology.org, resources on missions (Christian) education.
LFM. Social sciences & missions (academic journal)

 
Missional Christianity
Conversion to Christianity
Christian terminology
Christianization